Kiveriö is the 5th district of the city of Lahti, in the region of Päijät-Häme, Finland. It borders the districts of Kivimaa in the north, Kytölä in the northeast, Myllypohja in the east, Möysä and Paavola in the south and Keski-Lahti, Kartano and Niemi in the west.

The population of the statistical district of Kiveriö was 4,337 in 2019.

References 

Districts of Lahti